Ganas may refer to:

Ganaş, a village in Acâș Commune, Satu Mare County, Romania
Ganas an intentional community on Staten Island, New York

See also
Ganas, a company of beings in Hinduism